Carbia is a genus of moths in the family Geometridae.

Species
Carbia brunnefacta Holloway, 1997
Carbia calefacta Prout, 1941
Carbia calescens Walker, 1866
Carbia moderata (Walker, 1866)
Carbia moderescens Holloway, 1997
Carbia nexilinea (Warren, 1898)
Carbia pulchrilinea (Walker, 1866)

References

External links
Natural History Museum Lepidoptera genus database

Eupitheciini
Moth genera